Jean-Claude Désir (born 8 August 1946) is a former Haitian football midfielder who played for Haiti in the 1974 FIFA World Cup. He played for Aigle Noir AC as well as Detroit Cougars of the NASL.

References

External links
FIFA profile
Jean-Claude Desir NASL stats

1946 births
Sportspeople from Port-au-Prince
Haitian footballers
Haitian expatriate footballers
Haiti international footballers
Haitian expatriate sportspeople in the United States
Expatriate soccer players in the United States
Detroit Cougars (soccer) players
North American Soccer League (1968–1984) players
Aigle Noir AC players
Ligue Haïtienne players
Association football midfielders
CONCACAF Championship-winning players
1974 FIFA World Cup players
Living people